Susan M. Boyer is an American author. She lives in Greenville, in South Carolina, and has published seven mystery novels set in that state.

Novels

Lowcountry Boil (2012), Boyer's first book, won a Romance Writers of America Daphne du Maurier award in 2012 and an Agatha Award for Best First Novel in 2013, It was nominated for a Macavity Award in 2013. The Huffington Post called it "a simmering gumbo of a story full of spice, salt, heat and shrimp."

Lowcountry Bombshell was published in 2013 by Henery Press. Kirkus Reviews called it a "story that keeps you flipping the pages until late at night".

Lowcountry Boneyard was a Spring 2015 Southern Independent Booksellers Alliance Okra Pick, and was shortlisted for the 2016 Pat Conroy Southern Book Prize.

Lowcountry Bordello was released in November 2015.

Lowcountry Book Club was released July 5, 2016 and is a finalist for the 2017 Southern Book Prize.

Lowcountry Bonfire was released June 27, 2017.

Lowcountry Bookshop was released May 29, 2018.

Lowcountry Boomerang was released September 3, 2019.

Lowcountry Boondoggle was released June 30, 2020.

Lowcountry Boughs of Holly was released November 17, 2020.

References

Living people
American women novelists
Agatha Award winners
Women mystery writers
21st-century American novelists
Writers from Greenville, South Carolina
21st-century American women writers
Novelists from South Carolina
Year of birth missing (living people)